Hoseynabad-e Khan Qoli (also Romanized as Ḩoseynābād-e Khān Qolī; also known as Ḩoseynābād) is a village in Dadin Rural District, Jereh and Baladeh District, Kazerun County, Fars Province, Iran. At the 2006 census, its population was 273, in 54 families.

References 

Populated places in Kazerun County